is a ward of Sapporo composed of residential neighborhoods mostly arranged in grid patterns, and each built surrounding a train station, broken up by areas of farmland and some light-industrial areas. With 260,000 people, it is the most populated ward in Sapporo.

Geography
Kita-ku is located in the northern part of Sapporo. The southern end of the ward is more built up, essentially a continuation of the adjoining Chūō-ku ("central ward," downtown Sapporo). Ishikari River runs through and borders the northern part of Kita-ku.

Kita-ku is subject to a colder, windier climate than the rest of Sapporo, and as one rides the JR line through towards Ainosato (the north-easternmost part of Sapporo) in winter, one can watch the intensity of the snows increase.

Education

University

National
 Hokkaido University
 Hokkaido University of Education

Private
 Fuji Women's University
 Health Sciences University of Hokkaido, Sapporo Ainosato Campus

College
 Hokkaido Musashi Women's Junior College

High schools

Public
 Hokkaido Sapporo Kita High School
 Hokkaido Sapporo Hokuryo High School
 Hokkaido Sapporo Eiai High School
 Hokkaido Sapporo Technical High School
 Hokkaido Sapporo Intercultural and Technological High School
 Hokkaido Yuho High School
 Hokkaido Sapporo Shinkawa High School (city)

Private
 Sapporo Sosei High School
 Fuji High School

Transportation

Rail
 JR Hokkaido
 Hakodate Main Line: Sapporo Station
 Sasshō Line: Shinkawa - Shin-Kotoni - Taihei - Yurigahara - Shinoro - Takuhoku - Ainosato-Kyōikudai - Ainosato-kōen
 Sapporo Municipal Subway
 Namboku Line: Asabu - Kita-Sanjūyo-Jō - Kita-Nijūyo-Jō - Kita-Jūhachi-Jo - Kita-Jūni-Jō

Road
 Sasson Expressway: Sapporo-Kita IC - Shinkawa IC
 Route 5

Mascot 

She likes long walks and vegetables. Her birthday is October 21. Her charm points are her eyes and her star-shaped button. She is promoted as the mascot of the ward's health department before finally becoming the mascot of the ward on March 2019.

References

External links
 Kita-ku word office 

 
Wards of Sapporo